The House I Live In, directed by Eugene Jarecki, is a 2012 documentary film about the War on Drugs in the United States.

Participants
Michelle Alexander (civil rights litigator and the author of 2010's The New Jim Crow)
Shanequa Benitez (resident of Cromwell Towers housing project in Yonkers, New York)
The Honorable Mark W. Bennett (U.S. District Court Judge in Sioux City, Iowa)
Charles Bowden (journalist covering drug war-caused violence on the Mexico–U.S. border)
Mike Carpenter (Chief of Security at Joseph Harp Correctional Center in Lexington, Oklahoma) 
Marshal Larry Cearley (Police Officer in the village of Magdalena, New Mexico)
Eric Franklin (Warden of the Lexington Corrections Center in Lexington, Oklahoma)
Maurice Haltiwanger (sentenced to 20 years for crack cocaine distribution)
Dr. Carl Hart (Professor of Clinical Neuroscience, Columbia University)
Nannie Jeter (resident of New Haven, Connecticut)
Anthony Johnson (former small-time drug dealer in Yonkers, New York)
Dr. Gabor Maté (Hungarian-born physician specializing in the treatment of addiction - has been working in Vancouver, British Columbia, Canada for several decades)
Mark Mauer (Director, The Sentencing Project)
Richard Lawrence Miller (American historian and expert on the history of U.S. drug laws)
Charles Ogletree (Jesse Climenko Professor of Law at Harvard Law School, and a former academic advisor to Barack and Michelle Obama)
Kevin Ott (formerly serving life without parole on drug charges, Lexington Correctional Center, Lexington, Oklahoma)
Susan Randall (Private investigator in Vermont - formerly a journalist/producer for National Public Radio, All Things Considered, Morning Edition, Vermont Public Radio, and a researcher and associate producer for the A&E series Biography)
David Simon (creator of The Wire on HBO)
Julie Stewart (President and founder of Families Against Mandatory Minimums aka FAMM)
Dennis Whidbee (former drug dealer, and the father of Anthony Johnson)
Officer Fabio Zuena (Police Officer in the city of Providence, Rhode Island)
David Kennedy (Professor of Criminal Justice, John Jay College of Criminal Justice in New York City)

Reception
The documentary has been well received. Among the review aggregators, Rotten Tomatoes gave it 94% based on 56 reviews and Metacritic gave it 77/100 based on 24 reviews. Roger Ebert says The House I Live In "makes a shattering case against the War on Drugs." Peter Bradshaw  reviewed the film for The Guardian and summed it up as an "angry and personal attack on America's war on drugs [that] contends it is a grotesquely wasteful public-works scheme".

Awards
 January 2012: Won the Grand Jury Prize: Documentary at the Sundance Film Festival.
 April 2014: Won a Peabody Award.

See also
 List of American films of 2012
 Prison–industrial complex

References

External links
 
 
  National Public Radio Interview with Eugene Jarecki
  National Public Radio Article
 
 
 

2012 films
2012 documentary films
American documentary films
Sundance Film Festival award winners
History of drug control
Drug policy of the United States
Films directed by Eugene Jarecki
Criminal justice reform in the United States
2010s English-language films
2010s American films